Addison Blockhouse Historic State Park is a state park located in Volusia County, Florida. It features the Addison Blockhouse, a small coquina rock ruin that was on a 19th-century plantation and served as a kitchen as well as a fort.

To preserve its cultural heritage, the site is not open to the public. The park is accessible by boat going across the Tomoka River.

History
The Addison Blockhouse was built on a 19th-century plantation called Carrickfergus, established by John Moultrie. The blockhouse was originally an outside kitchen for Moultrie's overseer. Later the plantation was owned by John Addison, and then Duncan McRae. The plantation grew cotton and sugar from 1816 to 1836. During the Second Seminole War, the plantation was attacked on March 10, 1836. Two soldiers were killed and scalped at the site. The blockhouse was fortified by the Carolina Regiment of Volunteers to defend against the Seminoles, and became known as "Camp M'Rae". The plantation struggled financially and was later abandoned. The blockhouse was restored in the early 20th century, and has since been owned and maintained by Tomoka State Park.

Description
The Addison Blockhouse is now a roofless ruin. It is about 11.5 feet by 15 feet in size. It contains a circular tower in one corner, 6 feet in diameter and 11 feet in height, as well as a large fireplace. It has six foot walls with an embankment and moat.

There is also an adjacent foundation and walls of a sugar mill from 1832 during the time McRae owned the plantation.

See also
List of Florida state parks

References

External links
Official page at Florida State Parks
Florida Seminole Wars Heritage Trail.

State parks of Florida
Parks in Volusia County, Florida
Second Seminole War fortifications
Protected areas established in 1945
1945 establishments in Texas